Michel Odent (born 1930) is a French obstetrician and childbirth specialist.

Education
Born in a French village in 1930, Odent studied medicine in Paris and was educated as a surgeon in the 1950s. He has been presented in Lancet as “one of the last real general surgeons”.

Professional career
In charge of the surgical and maternity units of the Pithiviers hospital (France) from 1962 to 1985, Odent has developed a special interest in environmental factors influencing the birth process. He introduced the concepts of birthing rooms, birthing pools, and singing sessions for pregnant women. After his hospital career he was involved in home birth, founded in London the Primal Health Research Centre, and designed a database (primalhealthhresearch.com) to compile epidemiological studies exploring correlations between conditions during the natal “primal period” and subsequent child and mother health. Odent is Visiting Professor at Odessa National Medical University and Doctor Honoris Causa of Brasilia University.

Publications
Odent is the author of the first articles about the initiation of breastfeeding during the hour following birth, the first article about the use of birthing pools during labour, and the first article applying the Gate control theory of pain to obstetrics.

In a book published in 1986 (“Primal Health”) he provided evidence that homeostasis is established during the “primal period” (fetal life, birth and the months following birth): this is the phase of life when human basic adaptive systems are adjusting their “set point levels”. Odent is currently focusing on the possible evolution of Homo sapiens in relation to the modern ways to be born.

Odent is the author of 15 books published in 22 languages. In his books he is constantly referring to the concept of reduced neocortical activity as a key to rediscover the basic needs of labouring women and to make possible a real “fetus ejection reflex”.

His books include:
 Birth Reborn (1984, Pantheon, NY)
 Primal Health (1986. Century Hutchinson. London)
 Water and sexuality (1990, Penguin Books)
 The Farmer and the Obstetrician (Free Association Books)
 The Caesarean (Free Association Books )
 The Scientification of Love (Free Association Books)
 The Functions of the Orgasms: The Highways to Transcendence (2009, Pinter & Martin Ltd.)
 Childbirth in the Age of Plastics (2011, Pinter & Martin Ltd.)
 Childbirth and the Future of Homo sapiens (2013, Pinter & Martin Ltd.), reissued as Childbirth and the Evolution of Homo sapiens in 2014
 Do we need Midwives? (2015, Pinter & Martin Ltd.)
 The Birth of Homo, the Marine Chimpanzee (2017, Pinter & Martin Ltd.)The Future of Homo'' (2019, World Scientific Publishing Co. Ltd.)

See also
 Cesarean
 Childbirth
 Lactation
 Midwifery
 Natural childbirth
 Pain management during childbirth
 Water birth

References

French obstetricians
Living people
Natural childbirth advocates
1930 births